Last of the Runaways is the debut 1989 studio album by the rock group Giant. It included the hit, "I'm a Believer”, along with the band's biggest hit, “I'll See You in My Dreams".

Track listing
 "I'm a Believer" (Dann Huff, David Huff, Alan Pasqua, Mark Spiro, Phil Naish) – 5:45 
 "Innocent Days" (Dann Huff, Spiro) – 5:15 
 "I Can't Get Close Enough" (Dann Huff, Spiro) – 6:06 
 "I'll See You in My Dreams" (Pasqua, Spiro) – 4:46 
 "No Way Out" (Dann Huff, Terry Thomas, Pasqua, David Huff) – 4:04 
 "Shake Me Up" (Dann Huff, Pasqua, Mike Brignardello, Thomas) – 4:16 
 "It Takes Two" (Pasqua, Spiro) – 4:59 
 "Stranger to Me" (Dann Huff, Brignardello, Thomas) – 5:56 
 "Hold Back the Night" (Dann Huff, Spiro, Pasqua) – 4:11 
 "Love Welcome Home" (Dann Huff, Spiro, Naish) – 4:51 
 "The Big Pitch" (Dann Huff, Thomas, Pasqua) – 5:07

Personnel
Band members
Dann Huff – vocals, guitars
Alan Pasqua – keyboards and backing vocals
Mike Brignardello – bass guitar and backing vocals
David Huff – drums and backing vocals

Additional musicians
Lea Hart, Peter Howarth, Terry Thomas – backing vocals

Production
Produced by Terry Thomas
Engineered by Rafe McKenna
Assistant Engineers: Paul Cuddeford, Jon Mallison, Derek Murphy, Mark Willie, Helen Woodward
Mixing: Nigel Green, Rafe McKenna
Mastering: Arnie Acosta

References

External links
Heavy Harmonies page

Giant (band) albums
1989 debut albums
A&M Records albums